Herbert Edwin Ashford (18 December 1896 – September 1978) was an English professional football left half who played in the Football League for Queens Park Rangers.

Career statistics

References

1896 births
1978 deaths
English footballers
Footballers from Fulham
Association football wing halves
Southall F.C. players
Brentford F.C. players
Queens Park Rangers F.C. players
Notts County F.C. players
Ayr United F.C. players
Dartford F.C. players
Guildford City F.C. players
Tunbridge Wells F.C. players
Southern Football League players
English Football League players
Scottish Football League players